Não São Paulo, Vol. 1 is a compilation album released by famous Brazilian independent label Baratos Afins in 1986, containing a selection of songs by the most famous underground Brazilian post-punk bands active during the mid-1980s. The album's name is a reference to the Brian Eno-produced compilation No New York, released in 1978.

The compilation was re-issued under CD format in 1996, with four additional bonus live tracks recorded in 1988.

The second and last installment of the Não São Paulo series, Não São Paulo, Vol. 2, would be released in the following year.

Track listing

See also
 The Sexual Life of the Savages
 Não Wave
 Não São Paulo, Vol. 2
 No New York
 Sim São Paulo

References

External links
 Both the Não São Paulo albums at the official site of Baratos Afins 
 Não São Paulo, Vol. 1 at Discogs

1986 compilation albums
Post-punk compilation albums
Compilation albums by Brazilian artists